Chromalizus fragrans  is a species of beetle in the family Cerambycidae.

Subspecies
 Chromalizus fragrans conradsi (Aurivillius, 1907) 
 Chromalizus fragrans cranchii (White, 1853) 
 Chromalizus fragrans fragrans (Dalman, 1817)

Distribution
This species is present in Benin, Cameroon, Democratic Republic of the Congo, Ghana, Republic of the Congo, Sierra Leone, Tanzania and Togo.

References

Callichromatini
Beetles described in 1817